The Mentoring Partnership of Southwestern Pennsylvania is a non-profit organization located in Pittsburgh, Pennsylvania, that provides a variety of free services to local mentoring agencies and is the chief public advocate for mentoring in the region. It is one of almost three dozen mentoring partnerships across the country that is affiliated with MENTOR/National Mentoring Partnership but remains an administratively independent organization.

Areas of focus

Help start new mentoring programs
The Mentoring Partnership provides resources and training to individuals and organizations who are interested in starting new mentoring programs. These services include print materials, group trainings and individual meetings with Mentoring Partnership staff.

Provide technical assistance to existing programs
In addition to the services provided to new programs, the Mentoring Partnership offers their expertise to existing programs to help them diagnose the strengths and weaknesses of their program in order to improve mentor/mentee relationships and outcomes.

Recruit and place mentors
The Mentoring Partnership works to recruit volunteer mentors for their partner programs. The centerpiece is National Mentoring Month in January, during which The Mentoring Partnership partners with MENTOR to raise awareness about mentoring. Ongoing efforts include presentations to community organizations, businesses and universities as well as advertising and attracting media attention.

Train mentors
Research has shown that mentoring relationships are more productive when mentors receive training. The Mentoring Partnership offers free trainings to mentors who are at any of their partner programs. These include both basic pre-match training as well as more specialized ongoing trainings for mentors.

Bring together mentoring community
The Mentoring Partnership provides opportunities for mentoring programs' staff and volunteers to collaborate with and learn from each other. The primary conduit is monthly MLN (Mentoring Leadership Network) meetings, which are usually held on the second Tuesday of the month in Pittsburgh and the third Tuesday of the month in Beaver County.

References

External links

Mentorships
Alternative education
Education in Pittsburgh
Non-profit organizations based in Pittsburgh